Red Bee is the name of two fictional superhero appearing in American comic books.

The first Red debuted in Hit Comics #1, published in July 1940 by Quality Comics. The character was obtained by DC Comics in 1956 and has since fallen into public domain. 

The second, written as the grandniece of the original,  first appeared in Uncle Sam and the Freedom Fighters #5. She was written as the granddaughter of the original.

Fictional character biography

Richard Raleigh

The Red Bee's secret identity is Rick Raleigh, assistant district attorney in Superior City, Oregon. His superhero modus operandi is to put on a red and yellow costume and, with his trained bees and "stinger gun", fight Nazis and gangsters. His favorite bee is named Michael and lives inside his belt buckle for use in special circumstances. He has a series of adventures which lasts until issue #24 (Oct 1942).

According to Jess Nevins' Encyclopedia of Golden Age Superheroes, "he fights enemies like the evil spiritualist Dr. Marah, the Swordsmen (who use electrified swords), and Yellow Peril hatchet men".

The character never became very popular, and was largely forgotten until reappearing in DC Comics' All-Star Squadron. In the 'Squadron', it is learned he was killed by the Nazi supervillain Baron Blitzkrieg while saving the lives of Hourman and other allies. The group Freedom Fighters was formed out of the Squadron and the Red Bee was made an honorary member.

Red Bee appears as a ghost in the pages of Starman. The focus of this appearance is a dinner party attended by many deceased heroes. Other heroes in attendance include the original Mr. Terrific and Hourman. The topic discussed is the intense appeal of the superhero life.

Other post-Crisis appearances include a cameo in Animal Man in which the character resides in a canceled characters' "limbo", and in Bizarro World, where he and his agent attempt to improve his marketability. He is mentioned by Plastic Man as having been a friend and drinking buddy in an issue of JLA.

During the "Dark Nights: Death Metal" storyline, Red Bee is among the superheroes that were revived by Batman using a Black Lantern ring.

A panel in "The New Golden Age" one-shot revealed that Red Bee had a sidekick named Ladybug where she gained her size-shifting powers and Ladybug costume from Red Bee after he restored her to normal size during an attack from Professor Pollen. She proved to be a morale booster for Red Bee during their adventures until she vanished one day.

Jenna Raleigh
Rick's grandniece, Jenna, takes up the mantle of the Red Bee. She uses a mechanized battle suit and two robotic bees that can fire electricity. She assists the group in fighting S.H.A.D.E., an evil governmental organization. She soon learns that the leader of the Freedom Fighters Uncle Sam has assisted with the development of her technology. She decides to stay and fight with the group. Moments after this, she sees the death of the Invisible Hood, another ally, killed by a S.H.A.D.E.-influenced Ray.

Over the course of Uncle Sam and the Freedom Fighters vol. 2 (2007), Jenna is mutated by an alien insect colony into a human/bee hybrid, with enhanced physical abilities, pheromone production capabilities, and antennae on her head.

However, her mind is later completely circumvented by the mutation. After trying to colonize the entire Earth, she is cured of her affliction when Lanford Terrill uses his new Neon powers to destroy the insect influence. By the series' end, Jenna feels guilt over her actions, and she eschews the superhero life to continue her work in the research field.

Powers and abilities
Richard Raleigh had no superpowers but carried a special "Stinger Gun" and he specialized in the use of trained bees.

Jenna Raleigh possesses a human/insect biology which grants her enhanced physical attributes, pheromone production and the ability to "mark" people for later tracking. She formerly wore a mechanized battle suit which granted her enhanced strength and flight and used two large robotic bees that could fire electricity blasts.

Reception
In American Comic Book Chronicles: 1940-1944, comics historian Kurt Mitchell calls the Golden Age strip "inane", and describes it in a dismissive way: "... a masked mystery-man aided by the trained bees he stored in his belt buckle. No, that's not a typo. Bees. Trained bees. In his belt buckle".

In other media

Film
In the Peter Bogdanovich screwball comedy movie She's Funny That Way, several characters refer to Rhys Ifans' character, an actor named Seth Gilbert, as having played a character named "Red Bee Man" in five movies. The character is said to have "puffy sleeves" and a "trained bumble bee in his belt buckle".

Television
The Rick Raleigh version of Red Bee is briefly mentioned in the Stargirl episode "Hourman and Dr. Mid-Nite". Beth Chapel is told by the AI of Charles McNider that not protecting secret identities is what got a hero named Red Bee killed by Baron Blitzkrieg just like the comics version.

Red Bee was also mentioned on the second episode of series 2 of the British panel show Question Time in 2022.

Miscellaneous
Red Bee appears in comic Teen Titans Go #2 (2013).

References

External links
 Red Bee I Index
 Red Bee I Profile

Characters created by Charles Nicholas
Comics characters introduced in 1940
DC Comics female superheroes
Fictional characters from Oregon
Fictional district attorneys
Golden Age superheroes
Quality Comics superheroes